Raphistemma was a genus of flowering plants of the family Apocynaceae, first described as a genus in 1831, It is native to China and Southeast Asia. but now synonymous and subsumed into the genus Cynanchum.

Species
 Raphistemma hooperianum (Blume) Decne. - Guangxi, Thailand, Vietnam
 Raphistemma pulchellum (Roxb.) Wall. - Guangxi, Thailand, India, Laos, Peninsular Malaysia, Myanmar, Nepal, Sikkim

References

Apocynaceae genera
Asclepiadoideae